Harry Charles (born 15 July 1999) is a British show jumping competitor. He represented Great Britain at the 2020 Summer Olympics in Tokyo 2021, competing in individual jumping and team jumping. Charles replaced Holly Smith in the individual competition. In December, 2021 Harry won the Taittinger Ivy Stakes CI5* class individual jumping event at the London International Horse Show, staged at the ExCel Centre in London's Docklands, riding 15 year old gelding, Borsato (Contendro 1 x Nijinski).

Personal life
Charles was born on 15 July 1999, a son of Peter Charles and Tara Charles.

References

External links
 

1999 births
Living people
British male equestrians
Equestrians at the 2020 Summer Olympics
Olympic equestrians of Great Britain
British show jumping riders